Zombie-Loan (stylized as ZOMBIE-LOAN) is a Japanese manga series created by Peach-Pit: Banri Sendo and Shibuko Ebara. It is published by Square Enix and is serialized in the Japanese shōnen manga magazine GFantasy. The series is licensed in the United States by Yen Press.

An anime adaptation produced by Xebec M2 was announced and started broadcast on the Japanese network TV Asahi on July 3, 2007. It contained a total of eleven episodes, with the final broadcast on September 11, 2007. Subsequent episodes 12 and 13 were released as part of the seventh volume of the DVD release in April 2008, but no official word for television broadcast has been made. The anime has been licensed by Discotek Media; they released the complete series on DVD on September 30, 2014.

Plot

Michiru Kita possesses the Shinigami Eyes, a power which allows her to see a person's closeness to death by seeing a ring around the person's neck. When a person is marked to die, a gray ring appears, which darkens over time. Once the ring turns pitch black, the person dies. Chika Akatsuki and Shito Tachibana, two boys in her class, both have black rings around their necks, but are still alive. It is revealed that after an accident that was supposed to kill them both, the two made a deal with Zombie-Loan. In return for keeping them alive, the two have to hunt zombies to pay back their debt. When they find out about Michiru's ability they want her to find people with rings in order to eliminate them. The next day she was almost killed but brought back to life. After hunting Zombies in an episodic fashion, Chika and Shito defect from Zombie Loan and head to China in an attempt to save Shito's mother from the Xu-Fu. However, the Xu-Fu captures Shito and attempts to use his body as a vessel for Lao Ye, their leader. Lao Ye is eventually defeated and the duo returns to Zombie Loan.

Soon after, Ferryman begins to delete zombies for the sake of the Akashic records and has targeted the Zombie Loan. As they progress through the world of the Ferryman, they become involved in the affairs of a Ferryman who attempts to use records to destroy the world. Michiru discovers her powers result from her being an irregularity of the records as she was meant to die as a stillborn. Using her powers, she reverses time through the Akashic records, removing its irregularities and zombies. The series ends in a new time line with Michiru witnessing Chika and Shito's accident on television and Bekko announcing the reopening of Zombie Loan.

Media

Manga
The Zombie-Loan manga created by the Peach-Pit duo, Banri Sendo and Shibuko Ebara, was first published in May 2003. It is published by Enix and is serialized in the Japanese shōnen manga magazine GFantasy. The thirteenth and final volume was released in April 2011. The manga was released in North America by Yen Press from 2007 to 2012.

Anime
An anime adaptation produced by Xebec M2 was announced and started broadcast on the Japanese network TV Asahi on July 3, 2007. The Zombie-Loan anime series which soundtrack was composed by Hiroyuki Sawano first aired on TV Asahi on July 3, 2007, airing Tuesdays at 13:40 in Japan. The anime series was recently licensed by Discotek Media, and a Region 1 DVD release on September 30, 2014 was announced through their Facebook page. A total of 11 episodes aired with the final episode airing on September 11, 2007. Subsequent episodes 12 and 13 were released on the seventh Region 2 DVD, but no official word for television broadcast has been made. In them, a new story arc was started but not completed.

Episode list

Reception

"Besides having an intense and clever idea for a plot, Zombie Loan has a few great twists in it that only make it all the more fun to read." — Danica Davidson, Graphic Novel Reporter.

References

External links
 Official ZOMBIE-LOAN Anime Site 
 

2007 anime television series debuts
2007 Japanese television series endings
Anime composed by Hiroyuki Sawano
Anime series based on manga
Discotek Media
Gangan Comics manga
Peach-Pit
Shōnen manga
TV Asahi original programming
Xebec (studio)
Yen Press titles
Zombies in anime and manga
Zombies in comics